Phorate is an organophosphate used as an insecticide and acaricide.

Overview
At normal conditions, it is a pale yellow mobile liquid poorly soluble in water but readily soluble in organic solvents. It is relatively stable and hydrolyses only at very acidic or basic conditions. It is very toxic both for target organisms and for mammals including human. It inhibits acetylcholinesterase and butyrylcholinesterase.

Phorate is most commonly applied in granular form. It is non-biocumulative and has no residual action. But some metabolites may persist in soil. It also damages some seeds.

Toxicity
Phorate (Thimate) is absorbed readily through all ways. Its toxicity is high. Oral LD50 to rats is 1.1 – 3.2 mg/kg, to mice 3.5 – 6.5 mg/kg (technical phorate). Similar values has been found out to birds.

References

External links 
 

Acetylcholinesterase inhibitors
Organophosphate insecticides
Organosulfur compounds